David E. Zuckerman (born August 16, 1971) is an American politician who is currently serving as the 84th lieutenant governor of Vermont since 2023. He previously served two terms as the 82nd lieutenant governor of Vermont, from 2017 to 2021. A member of the Vermont Progressive Party, he previously served in the Vermont House of Representatives for seven terms (1997–2011), and the Vermont Senate for two (2013–2017). In 2020, Zuckerman was a candidate for governor of Vermont. He ran with the support of both the Progressive Party and the Democratic Party, but lost to incumbent Governor Phil Scott in the general election. 

In 2016, Zuckerman ran for lieutenant governor as a Progressive, and also received the nomination of the Democratic Party by defeating Speaker of the Vermont House of Representatives Shap Smith and Representative Kesha Ram in the Democratic primary. He defeated Republican State Senator Randy Brock in the 2016 general election. Zuckerman was reelected in 2018 and again in 2022 following a two-year hiatus from elected office during which he unsuccessfully ran for governor.

Zuckerman was the first Progressive Party candidate to win statewide office in Vermont and the only third party candidate to win a statewide election in the 2022 United States elections. Other Progressive-endorsed candidates who have won statewide-office elections, including Doug Hoffer for Vermont state auditor, were primarily affiliated with the Vermont Democratic Party. Zuckerman's elections to statewide office have reinforced Vermont as a state with the presence of a major party other than the Democratic and Republican parties.

Early life and education
Zuckerman grew up in Brookline, Massachusetts, and graduated from Brookline High School in 1989. His father is Jewish. In 1995, he graduated from the University of Vermont with a Bachelor of Arts degree in environmental studies and a minor in chemistry.

Career

State House of Representatives
Prior to serving in the House, he served on the Burlington Electric Commission. Zuckerman ran for the Vermont House of Representatives in 1994 while still enrolled in college and lost by 59 votes. He ran again two years later and become the fourth Progressive Party member to serve in the Vermont House, a seat that he held through 2011.

While in the House, he served for six years on the Natural Resources and Energy Committee as well as six years on the Agriculture Committee, including four as the chairperson. He finished his time in the House of Representatives by serving on the Ways and Means Committee.

Zuckerman considered running for the U.S. House of Representatives in the 2006 election when Vermont's lone House seat was being vacated by independent Bernie Sanders, who was a candidate for the United States Senate. Zuckerman eventually decided not to run in order to continue serving as Agriculture chairman in the Vermont House.

State Senate
Zuckerman ran for Vermont State Senate from Chittenden County in the 2012 elections and won a seat in this six-member, at-large district. In the Senate, Zuckerman served on the Agriculture and Education committees; he was vice chairperson of Agriculture, and clerk of Education.

In his time in the legislature, Zuckerman was involved in the passage of Vermont's civil union and marriage equality laws, workers' rights legislation, increasing the minimum wage, sustainable (economic and environmental) agricultural policy, cannabis policy reform, election law reform, many renewable energy initiatives, progressive taxation policy as well as universal healthcare.

In January 2014, Zuckerman introduced legislation that would allow for recreational sale and use of cannabis. If passed it would allow for possession of up to two ounces of cannabis, and the cultivation of up to 3 plants for anyone 21 and over. It would also have the penalty for underage consumption of cannabis be the same as the current penalty for underage drinking.

Lieutenant Governor

In 2016, Zuckerman ran for lieutenant governor as a Progressive candidate, earning the endorsement of Bernie Sanders before the August 9 primary. He ran unopposed in the Progressive primary, while simultaneously defeating Vermont House Speaker Shap Smith and Representative Kesha Ram to win the Democratic nomination, and went on to defeat Republican Randy Brock in the general election. Zuckerman was reelected in 2018, defeating Republican Donald H. Turner by a margin of 57% to 39%. 

Zuckerman opted not to seek reelection for a third term in 2020, instead running against Republican incumbent Governor Phil Scott. He ran with the support of both the Progressive Party and the Democratic Party, but lost to incumbent Governor Phil Scott by a margin of 68% to 27% in the 2020 general election.

When Lieutenant Governor Molly Gray opted not to run for reelection in order to run in the Democratic primary for Vermont's open U.S. House seat, Zuckerman announced a third campaign for lieutenant governor in 2022. He won the Democratic primary and the general election in 2022, defeating Republican nominee Joe Benning by a margin of 54% to 43% and becoming only the second person in Vermont history to be elected to serve non-consecutive terms as lieutenant governor.

Agriculture 
Beginning in 1999, Zuckerman and his wife, Rachel Nevitt, built a successful organic farm in Burlington's Intervale, a network of a dozen farms located in and serving the city. Zuckerman served on the American Farm Bureau Federation Young Farmers & Ranchers Committee. He is also a member of the Vermont Farm Bureau and Northeast Organic Farming Association chapter in Vermont.

Their produce is almost exclusively sold within Chittenden County. They operate a summer Community Supported Agriculture (CSA) with 275 members, a winter CSA with 125 members, and sell year round at the local Burlington farmers market.

Political positions

Labor 
Zuckerman has been a advocate of labor protections such as raising the minimum wage, paid family leave, and increasing protections for workers.

Opposition to Bush administration
On April 25, 2006, Zuckerman introduced a resolution for the Vermont State Legislature to ask the United States Congress to impeach President George W. Bush. The motion failed 87–60 in a roll call vote on April 25, 2007.

Property tax reform 
Zuckerman supported a bill to lower property tax rates for households earning less than $200,000 in the 2015–16 session. He also helped pass legislation to model this reform in time for the 2017 session.

Equal pay 
Zuckerman was a sponsor of H.440 in 2001, a bill which would require equal pay for equal work.

GMO labeling 
In 2014, Zuckerman was the lead Senate author of Vermont's first-in-the-nation GMO Labeling Law.

Vaccines
Zuckerman is critical of the philosophy of mandatory vaccinations, a view which led to scrutiny during the coronavirus pandemic. He has said that he is skeptical about the Center for Disease Control and Prevention's position on vaccines due to its purported connections to the pharmaceutical industry, but believes the science of vaccination is sound. He said that he believed that most people should vaccinate their children, but believes in exemptions for medical or religious reasons. He said that some of his constituents had said that vaccines gave their children allergic reactions. He has said that his own daughter is vaccinated.

Electoral history

Notes

References

External links

 Government website
 Campaign website

|-

 
|-

|-

 

1971 births
21st-century American Jews
21st-century American politicians
Brookline High School alumni
Candidates in the 2020 United States elections
Democratic Party members of the Vermont House of Representatives
Democratic Party Vermont state senators
Jewish American people in Vermont politics
Lieutenant Governors of Vermont
Living people
Politicians from Boston
Politicians from Brookline, Massachusetts
People from Hinesburg, Vermont
University of Vermont alumni
Vermont Progressive Party politicians